Two ships in the United States Navy have been named USS Gregory for Francis Gregory.

She was sunk off California as a target in March 1971.

United States Navy ship names